Hoboken is a city in Brantley County, Georgia, United States. It is part of the Brunswick, Georgia Metropolitan Statistical Area. As of the 2020 census, the city had a population of 480.

History
The city's name most likely is a transfer from Hoboken, New Jersey. The Georgia General Assembly incorporated the place as the City of Hoboken in 1920. Hoboken served as the first county seat of Brantley County from the county's formation in 1920 until 1923 when the seat was transferred to Nahunta.

Geography

Hoboken is located in western Brantley County at  (31.182720, -82.133891). U.S. Route 82 (called Main Street) passes through the city, leading east  to Nahunta, the county seat, and west  to Waycross.

Demographics

As of the census of 2000, there were 463 people, 183 households, and 142 families residing in the city. The racial makeup of the city was 88.77% White, 8.86% African American, 0.22% from other races, and 2.16% from two or more races. Hispanic or Latino of any race were 1.08% of the population.

There were 183 households, out of which 30.1% had children under the age of 18 living with them, 63.9% were married couples living together, 8.7% had a female householder with no husband present, and 22.4% were non-families. 21.3% of all households were made up of individuals, and 5.5% had someone living alone who was 65 years of age or older.  The average household size was 2.53 and the average family size was 2.92.

In the city, the population was spread out, with 24.0% under the age of 18, 7.8% from 18 to 24, 24.6% from 25 to 44, 31.3% from 45 to 64, and 12.3% who were 65 years of age or older.  The median age was 40 years. For every 100 females, there were 104.9 males.  For every 100 females age 18 and over, there were 96.6 males.

The median income for a household in the city was $26,818, and the median income for a family was $33,750. Males had a median income of $22,917 versus $20,089 for females. The per capita income for the city was $14,496.  About 14.9% of families and 20.0% of the population were below the poverty line, including 25.5% of those under age 18 and 27.1% of those age 65 or over.

Cultural events
Hoboken has a continuous tradition of periodic singings from the Sacred Harp that has continued for over 150 years. These currently include monthly singings and an annual convention.

Twin Oaks Park, located  outside of Hoboken (and with a Hoboken mailing address), hosts two bluegrass conventions every year. It is a privately owned campground, where people from all over can bring their RV's, pop-ups, and listen to the melodic sounds of bluegrass music.

See also
 List of county seats in Georgia (U.S. state)

References

External links
Sommers, Laurie Kay (2010) "Hoboken Style: Meaning and Change in Okefenokee Sacred Harp Singing" Southern Spaces 
Sacred Harp in Hoboken: radio programs, video documentary
Twin Oaks Park

Cities in Georgia (U.S. state)
Cities in Brantley County, Georgia
Brunswick metropolitan area
Former county seats in Georgia (U.S. state)